Chronic fatigue may refer to:
 Fatigue (medical)#Chronic, a long-term state of physical or mental exhaustion, a symptom of many chronic illnesses
 Chronic fatigue syndrome, a medical condition characterized by long-term fatigue and other long term symptoms that limit a person's ability to carry out ordinary daily activities.